Firebox Records was a Finnish record label based in Seinäjoki, Southern Ostrobothnia. They specialized in doom metal.

Firedoom Music was a subsidiary label of Firebox Records specializing in more extreme doom metal and other obscure genres. The Firebox label has a distribution network for its releases worldwide including Plastic Head Distribution in England, SPV in Germany, Bertus in Benelux and The End Records in North America.

Artists

Firebox Records
Dark the Suns
Dauntless
Depressed Mode
The Eternal
Fall of the Leafe
Grave Flowers
Grendel
Jääportit
Manitou
Mar de Grises
Misery Inc.
SaraLee
Saturnus
Scent of Flesh
ShamRain
Spiritus Mortis
Throes of Dawn
Total Devastation
Velvetcut
Wasara
Wraith of the ropes

Firedoom Music
Aarni
Ablaze in Hatred
DOOM:VS
Forest of Shadows
Mar de Grises
My Shameful
Pantheïst
Torture Wheel
Tyranny
Umbra Nihil
Until Death Overtakes Me
Woods of Belial

References

External links
 

Heavy metal record labels
Finnish record labels
Record labels established in 2001
Doom metal record labels
Black metal record labels
Death metal record labels
Ambient music record labels
Goth record labels